The Curse of the Flying Wombat is a 13-part serial of the British radio comedy series I'm Sorry, I'll Read That Again. It was written by Graeme Garden and Bill Oddie.

Cast, characters and plot 

(complete cast in order of appearance)

Main characters are listed in bold letters

 King Lear — John Cleese
 Tim Brown Windsor — Tim Brooke-Taylor
 Host of the "Puma and Mowing Machine" — David Hatch
 Mr. Hatch — David Hatch
 Lady Fiona Rabbit-Vacuum (Jim Lad) — Jo Kendall
 The Bosun — Bill Oddie
 Captain Cleese — John Cleese
 The Hand — Bill Oddie
 "Lookout" — Bill Oddie
 Casey O'Sullivan — Bill Oddie
 Masher Wilkins — John Cleese
 The First Class Passenger — John Cleese
 Grimbling (Butler to Tim's Aunt) — Bill Oddie
 Lady Constance de Coverlet — Tim Brooke-Taylor
 Maisie Robinson — Jo Kendall
 Colonel Clutch-Featheringhaugh — David Hatch
 Nosebone — Bill Oddie
 Wong (the Supply-Keeper) — Tim Brooke-Taylor
 Wong Tu (his brother) — John Cleese
 Mustafa Drink (the Slave Trader) — David Hatch
 "Hurricane" Flossie — Tim Brooke-Taylor
 The Caliph — Bill Oddie
 Angus McFergus — Bill Oddie
 Jeannie McFergus — Jo Kendall
 Slave-Girl Trader — Bill Oddie
 Torturer — John Cleese
 Zoo Keeper — John Cleese
 Policeman — John Cleese
 Sir ..... of the Desert — John Cleese
 Sand Witch — Bill Oddie
 Bar Keeper — Bill Oddie
 Ali Baba — Bill Oddie
 Dwarf — Bill Oddie
 High Priestess — Jo Kendall
 Dawn — Jo Kendall
 Curtain — Tim Brooke-Taylor
 Armand — Bill Oddie

In the first episode, Tim Brown-Windsor is being pressganged on to the ship "The Flying Wombat". This subplot is however soon forgotten, as Tim and his girlfriend Fiona Rabbit-Vacuum (who is disguised as a male cabin-boy, Jim Ladd) join the expedition that Captain Cleese has set out for: to find a jewel called The Green Eye of the Yellow God, as in the poem by Rudyard Kipling - the name of the gem is however soon changed into "The Green Eye of the little Yellow Dog".  Despite sabotages from the villain Casey O'Sullivan and his moronic sidekick Masher Wilkins, the ship sails on for several episodes, picking up the recurring ISIRTA characters Grimbling and Lady Constance (introduced here) on the way. Eventually, the ship is abandoned, and the main cast travel on by foot. They are held up in Baghdad as slaves, but finally reach Kathmandu, where they find the jewel in question. However, as the final twist in chapter 13, the "Eye" is found to belong to a fierce dog that is neither small nor yellow (cowardly), but attacks them. In the season's special Christmas episode, the 14th part of the saga is introduced, but the cast of characters is chastised by a BBC official for having produced more than the agreed 13 episodes, and "forced" to perform a pantomime, "Jack and the bean stalk". Later, in season 4, the cast is on the contrary "rewarded" with a return; they perform the play "Champion the Wonder Mouse". Lady Constance appears in many later episodes; Tim, Fiona and Grimbling also remained as recurring characters.

The Curse of the Flying Wombat - Part 1
In 1411, John of Gaunt .......
(opening music)
 Skit: Vets (Bird, Cocker Spaniel)
 Skit: Jo Kendall's Italian
 Skit: Three baby sketch ("I can reach the china cupboard - it's going to be smashing!")
 Song: "The Ferret Song"
 Episode: "The Curse of the Flying Wombat - Part 1"

The Curse of the Flying Wombat - Part 2
 Skit: Angus Prune and Miss Rosie Bedsock
 Skit: Killferret Hall, Glasgow Hall (with Scottish song and Rhubarb Tartan)
 Skit: Leslie Grapevine and bird impressions
 Skit: Timothy and Jo Kendall honeymoon
 Skit: Mr. Potter's idea about horse-racing
 Song: "My Mom Has Lost My Dad"
 Episode: The Curse of the Flying Wombat - Part 2

The Curse of the Flying Wombat - Part 3
 Skit: John Cleese's bathtub (bath night)
(opening music)
 Skit: Mr. Smiley (Military Actor: Mercenary)
 Skit: Alice through the looking glass
 Skit: John and Mary sketch
 Skit: Minister (on new coal face techniques) falling apart
 Song: "Where Is My Smile"
 Episode: The Curse of the Flying Wombat - Part 3

The Curse of the Flying Wombat - Part 4
 Skit: Playing glasses of water
 Skit: International Trade Exhibition in East Germany (and defecting)
 Episode: The Curse of the Flying Wombat - Part 4
 Song: Favourite Melody (Beethoven's Fifth)
 Play: "William the Conqueror"

The Curse of the Flying Wombat - Part 5
 Skit: Let's change the image
(opening music)
 Skit: The Spy With My Cold
 Skit: Gentlewoman's Protection Action Group
 Skit: Brown: Girl in Boys' School
 Song: "Recorded - Live in Cabaret"
 Episode: The Curse of the Flying Wombat - Part 5

The Curse of the Flying Wombat - Part 6
 Skit: Meet the Orchestra
 Skit: Jungle outside lavatory
 Skit: Sadistic boss
 Skit: Newsflash: Closure of House of Commons
 Song: "With a Girl Like You - Wild Things"
 Episode: The Curse of the Flying Wombat - Part 6

The Curse of the Flying Wombat - Part 7
 Skit: New Movies - including:
 ---- Western: "Flower of the West: The Lone Hydrangea"
 ----"The Sound of Monks (with their own version of Supercalifrigalisticexpialadotious)
 Skit: Policeman with wife
 Song: "Working on the Railroad"
 Episode: The Curse of the Flying Wombat - Part 7

The Curse of the Flying Wombat - Part 8
 Skit: Scientific breakthrough
 Skit: Clapham Mystery Trial (including: songs from the Policeman's Opera)
 Song: "The Ferrets of Old England"
 Episode: The Curse of the Flying Wombat - Part 8

The Curse of the Flying Wombat - Part 9
"Oscar" nominations for Radio
Angus Prune Awards for Bravery
 Skit: International Cabaret (including 'Greek' song)
 Skit: John and Mary sketch (with burglars)
 Skit: Amateur Comedy (Shakespeare)
 Song: "Baby Go to Sleep" (lullaby)
 Episode: The Curse of the Flying Wombat - Part 8

The Curse of the Flying Wombat - Part 10
 Skit:
 Skit:
 Skit:
 Song: "I've Got the Hiccups"
 Episode: The Curse of the Flying Wombat - Part 10

The Curse of the Flying Wombat - Part 11
 Skit:
 Skit:
 Skit:
 Song: "Man's Best Friend - Duck"
 Episode: The Curse of the Flying Wombat - Part 11

The Curse of the Flying Wombat - Part 12
 Skit: The Ark Is Full
 Skit: The Aristocracy of Great Britain
 Skit: The Driving Test
 Skit: Three Babies #3
 Skit: Hangover
 Song: "Yodelling Goatherd"
 Skit: Did You Know?
 Episode: The Curse of the Flying Wombat - Part 12

The Curse of the Flying Wombat - Part 13
 Skit:
 Skit:
 Skit:
 Song: "I Love a Show" (Footlights)
 Episode: The Curse of the Flying Wombat - Part 13

External links
 BBC Radio ISIRTA

ISIRTA plays